Ulf Nilsson (born 28 February 1948) is a Swedish sailor. He competed in the Flying Dutchman event at the 1972 Summer Olympics.

References

External links
 

1948 births
Living people
Swedish male sailors (sport)
Olympic sailors of Sweden
Sailors at the 1972 Summer Olympics – Flying Dutchman
Sportspeople from Gothenburg